Andrey Vladimirovich Balanov (born April 27, 1976 in Podolsk) is a former Russian boxer best known for winning the 2006 European Amateur Boxing Championships at welterweight, being part of the Russian 2005 team at the Boxing World Cup and competing at the 2008 Summer Olympics.

Career
In 2005 he was part of the Russian team that won the 2005 Boxing World Cup.

At the 2005 World Amateur Boxing Championships he exited early against eventual Cuban winner Erislandi Lara.

At the Euros 2006 he beat Oleksandr Stretskyy from Ukraine in the semifinals and Bulgarian Spas Genov in the final 30:12.

At the 2007 World Amateur Boxing Championships he again beat Olexandr Stretskiy but was upset by Thai Non Boonjumnong.

At the first Olympic qualifier 2008 he was upset by English teenager Billy Joe Saunders, at the second he lost to Frenchman Jaoid Chiguer but barely qualified by defeating Samuel Matevosyan. In Beijing he lost in his second bout to Demetrius Andrade.

References

External links
 World 2005
 Euro 2006
 2nd Qualifier

1976 births
Living people
Welterweight boxers
Boxers at the 2008 Summer Olympics
Olympic boxers of Russia
Russian male boxers
People from Podolsk
Sportspeople from Moscow Oblast